William Handcock (1808 – 26 November 1890) was an Australian politician.

He was a storekeeper at Drayton before entering politics. In 1859 he was elected to the New South Wales Legislative Assembly for Darling Downs, but with the establishment of the separate colony of Queensland the seat was discontinued later that year. Handcock died at Waverley in 1890.

References

 

1808 births
1890 deaths
Members of the New South Wales Legislative Assembly
19th-century Australian politicians